The Basilica of Our lady of Mount Carmel & St Joseph, popularly known as Varapuzha Basilica, is in Varapuzha, a northern suburban town of Kochi City in the Ernakulam district of Kerala state, India. It was built in 1673. The basilica is dedicated to Our Lady of Mount Carmel and St Joseph. The solemnity of the Assumption of Our Lady is celebrated as an annual sixteen-day confraternity festival, from 31 July to 15 August. The basilica is also famous as a pilgrimage centre in the southern part of India. It serves as the mother church for 14 churches.

History 

This church was the seat of the metropolitans until 1904. The headquarters was then shifted to the town of Ernakulam, for easier administration. As the original seat of the Latin bishop, the church holds a unique place in the history of Latin Catholics in the area. Presently the church offers solace to the faithful who gather there for the powerful intercessions of Our Lady and St. Joseph.

In 1653 Fr. Mathew of St. Joseph reached Goa as a missionary. The old Varapuzha Church was built in 1673.

On 20 February 1700 Pope Clement appointed Carmelite Missionary Fr. Angelus Francis as the Vicar Apostolic Malabar. All those who guided the life and activities of the Church from 1700 AD to 1886 AD were known as "Vicar Apostolics". On 13 March 1709 the Holy See suppressed the Malabar Vicariate, and the Varapuzha Vicariate was erected officially. In 1886 the Varapuzha Vicariate was raised to the status of archdiocese. Until 1904, Varapuzha was the official residence of the Archbishops of Varapuzha. From 1886 onwards the bishops took charge and care of the diocese of Varapuzha from this place named "Varapuzha".

On 1 September 1886 the Varapuzha Vicariate was officially raised to the status of archdiocese, and Rev. Dr. Leonardo Mellano OCD was consecrated as the first archbishop of the Archdiocese of Varapuzha.

In those years the Varapuzha Church was the only Catholic Church of this locality. At that time this was the home to all the Syrian Catholics of this locality.

The famous Carmelite Missionary Fr. Paulinus (missionary from 1744 to 1780)  in his famous book India Orientalis Christiana describes this church as the "Church of Latin and Chaldean rites".

The church has two patron saints: Our Lady of Mount Carmel and St. Joseph; the latter resulted from the special devotion of its founder Fr. Mathew of St. Joseph.

The old church underwent a major uplift and reconstruction in 1927 when its old front doom collapsed in 1919.

In 1886 the Archdiocese of Varapuzha was established, and the church became the cathedral church of the archdiocese. This status remained with the church until 1936, when St. Francis Cathedral was built in Ernakulam

The church is the final resting place of 28 Carmelite missionaries, including eight bishops of the Diocese of Varapuzha

When Tipu Sultan (1750–1799), the notorious Muslim conqueror, attacked, plundered and killed many, Varapuzha was providentially left out being an island, but it became the place of refuge for all from all religions and castes. The Carmelite missionaries took care of all of them.

In 1682 the Carmelite missionaries of Varapuzha requested the Propaganda Fidei for the construction of a seminary for the formation of the indigenous clergy.

In 1685 the seminary was closed down. A new seminary was built in 1766 in Varapuzha. At that time it accepted candidates from both Latin and Syrian rites.

In 1790 this seminary was closed following the attack of Tipu Sultan, the Muslim conqueror. The seminary was reopened in 1832. In 1866 the Syrians were shifted to the Puthenpally Seminary.

From 1659 to 1904, sixteen bishops and two archbishops guided the diocese from this place. In those days all travels and transportation were through water.

In a letter dated December 11, 2020, the office of the Congregation for Divine Worship and the Discipline of the Sacraments approved the application of the Archdiocese of Verapoly to elevate the status of the former cathedral of Varapuzha to a minor basilica. As a minor basilica, it will be one of only 28 nationwide and 10th in Kerala, and the first one in the country to be named after St Joseph.

Servant of God Mother Eliswa 

The tomb of the Servant of God, Mother Eliswa (1831–1913), the Mother Foundress of the first indigenous Carmelite Congregations (CTC and CMC) in St. Joseph's Convent, Varapuzha, is here.

Gallery

See also
Roman Catholic Archdiocese of Verapoly
 Basilica of Our Lady of Good Health, Velankanni
 Basilica of Our Lady of Ransom, Vallarpadam
St. Philomena's Forane Church & St. Chavara Pilgrimage Centre

References

External links
 www.varapuzhabasilica.org

Christian organizations established in the 17th century
Roman Catholic churches in Kochi
Roman Catholic shrines in India